Wysoki Most  may refer to the following places in Poland:

Wysoki Most, Kuyavian-Pomeranian Voivodeship
Wysoki Most, Podlaskie Voivodeship

See also
Wysoki (disambiguation)